VBM may refer to:

 Valence band maximum - highest energy of the electrons in the valence band of a (semiconducting) solid, see band gap
 Value-based management - an approach to corporate strategic management
 Voxel-based morphometry - a technique in neuroimaging analysis
 Virginia Beach Mariners
 The Virtual Beit Midrash of Yeshivat Har Etzion
 The Virtual Beit Midrash of Mercaz HaRav Kook
 Valence Band Maximum, see Band gap
 Vote by mail